Stanislav Šesták (born 16 December 1982) is a retired Slovak football striker, manager, as well as a club official and a local politician. Šesták last managed Slovakia's oldest club Tatran Prešov in 3. Liga - East.

Club career

Slovakia
Šesták made his first football steps in Demjata, where he played one season in local club FK Demjata, in team U15. His parents took him to youth camp of 1. FC Tatran Prešov. This was his first step to professional football. Officially, Šesták started his career at Tatran Prešov. In December 2001, he moved to Slovan Bratislava. He only played two seasons in Bratislava and then moved on to MŠK Žilina in December 2003. In the 2005–06 season, Šesták took with 17 goals the fourth place in the top goalscorer list of the Slovak league. One year later his club MŠK Žilina won the Slovak championship. Šesták scored 15 goals in that season and was second in the Slovak top goalscorer list.

VfL Bochum
On 7 June 2007, Šesták joined German Bundesliga side VfL Bochum. He signed a four-year contract at the club until 2011. At Bochum he was expected to replace the Greek international Theofanis Gekas who, after winning the top scorer crown in the previous season, had been transferred to Bayer Leverkusen.

Šesták made a total of 86 appearances for VfL Bochum and scored 28 goals (17 assists) during his three-year spell with the Ruhr valley outfit. In the 2007–08 season he was with 13 goals and 9 assists the third-best scorer in the league, behind FC Bayern Munich's Luca Toni and Werder Bremen's Diego. On 11 April 2009, Šesták marked within 27 minutes against TSG 1899 Hoffenheim a hat-trick (due to the half-time break between the first two goals, however, it could be counted as flawless).

In Turkey
After Bochum's relegation to the 2. Bundesliga he was loaned for the 2010–11 season for one year to Turkish side MKE Ankaragücü. During his one-year spell, he racked up 24 appearances for the club, scoring ten goals (two assists). In June 2011, Šesták was transferred permanently to the club for an undisclosed transfer fee. However, due to the financial troubles of that club, Bochum had (as of January 2013) never received the entire transfer fee and MKE Ankaragücü still owed them about €2.374 million, Only three months later, in September 2011, Šesták moved to league rivals Bursaspor where he signed a three-year contract.

Ferencváros
On 16 June 2015, Šesták signed for Hungarian top club Ferencvárosi TC.

On 2 April 2016, he became Hungarian League champion with Ferencváros after losing to Debreceni VSC 2–1 at the Nagyerdei Stadion in the 2015–16 Nemzeti Bajnokság I season.

International career
Šesták began his youth career in 2000. During his youth career he was a member of Slovak under-18 and under-21 national teams.

Since 2004, Šesták played regularly for the Slovak national team. He has earned his first senior cap when he was 21 years old in a 3-1 victory over Luxembourg on 18 August 2004, when he came on as a substitute for Szilárd Németh for the last six minutes of the game. He scored his first senior international goals against San Marino on 13 October 2007. His first opponent after his move to VfL Bochum was the German national team.

He was one of the most important players of his national team during their 2010 FIFA World Cup qualification campaign when he became the top scorer of his team with 6 goals in 6 matches and helped to qualify for their first major tournament ever. On 15 October 2008, Šesták scored two quick goals in the closing minutes against Poland to turn the game around from 0–1. He also scored the first goal in the match Czech Republic-Slovakia on 1 April 2009. As a part of the Slovak squad at 2010 FIFA World Cup he played in every match of Slovakia in the group stage.

During the era of coaching duo Griga and Hipp he was mostly ignored by them and was nominated only for one friendly match against Poland on 26 May 2012, where he played in the first 57 minutes.

He returned to international football under the new coach of Slovak national team Ján Kozák on 14 August 2013, with a goal in a 1–1 away draw with Romania.

He also helped his country to qualify for their first UEFA European Championship in 2016. He has appeared in three matches during their successful qualification campaign and scored a game-closing goal against Belarus on 12 October 2014 in the 92nd minute. It was also his last international goal.
He was also a member of their final squad at UEFA Euro 2016. Mostly on the bench during the tournament, Šesták played in their last game of the tournament in the Round of 16 against Germany on 26 June 2016, which they lost 0-3. He came on as a substitute for Michal Ďuriš in the 64th minute. After the match, he has officially announced his retirement from international football after 12 years, at the age of 33.

At the time of his retirement he was the sixth best goalscorer of Slovakia with 13 goals in 66 matches.

Coaching and later career
At the end of April 2017, Šesták was appointed playing caretaker manager of FK Poprad until the end of the season. He continued as a part of the staff for the 2017-18 season, functioning as a playing assistant manager.

In the summer 2019, he retired from professional football and was instead hired as sporting director of FK Poprad. He also returned to play for his former youth club FK Demjata.

Other activities
In October 2022, Šesták became a city councillor in Prešov, supporting mayoral candidate, fellow official of Tatran Prešov and a former international football referee Ľuboš Micheľ. He ran as a joint candidate of HLAS-SD and Aliancia in city's first electoral precinct.

Private life
Šesták is married to his wife Milka Šestáková. The couple has three children. In December 2022, Šesták's family home in Demjata burned down.

Career statistics

Club

International
Scores and results list Slovakia's goal tally first, score column indicates score after each Šesták goal.

Honours
MŠK Žilina
 Slovak Super Liga: 2003-04, 2006-07

Ferencvaros
 Nemzeti Bajnokság I: 2015–16
 Magyar Kupa: 2015–16

References

External links

 
 
 

1982 births
Living people
People from Prešov District
Sportspeople from the Prešov Region
Slovak footballers
Slovak expatriate footballers
Slovak football managers
Association football forwards
Slovakia international footballers
Slovakia youth international footballers
Slovakia under-21 international footballers
2010 FIFA World Cup players
UEFA Euro 2016 players
Slovak Super Liga players
2. Liga (Slovakia) players
Bundesliga players
2. Bundesliga players
Süper Lig players
Nemzeti Bajnokság I players
MKE Ankaragücü footballers
MŠK Žilina players
ŠK Slovan Bratislava players
VfL Bochum players
Bursaspor footballers
Ferencvárosi TC footballers
FK Poprad players
1. FC Tatran Prešov managers
3. Liga (Slovakia) managers
Slovak expatriate sportspeople in Germany
Expatriate footballers in Germany
Slovak expatriate sportspeople in Turkey
Expatriate footballers in Turkey
Slovak expatriate sportspeople in Hungary
Expatriate footballers in Hungary